Gerald Lynn McNeil (born March 27, 1962) is a former American football wide receiver and return specialist who played in the National Football League (NFL) for five seasons with the Cleveland Browns and Houston Oilers. He also played in the United States Football League (USFL) for two seasons with the Houston Gamblers.

The lightest player in the NFL, McNeil was nicknamed "The Ice Cube" because he was small and difficult for tacklers to grab hold of. He was drafted in 1984 and selected to the Pro Bowl in 1987. Known for his explosive returning ability, McNeil scored four touchdowns in his NFL career, including an 84-yard punt return against the Detroit Lions and a 100-yard kickoff return against the Pittsburgh Steelers.

Early years
McNeil was born in West Germany. He attended Killeen High School in Killeen, Texas. 

McNeil played college football at Baylor University in Waco, Texas, from 1980 to 1983. He earned All-American honors as a wide receiver. One of his teammates was future Houston Oilers quarterback Cody Carlson. McNeil's brother, Pat, also played football at Baylor.

In his four seasons at Baylor, McNeil caught 163 passes for 2,651 yards, returned 101 punts for 886 yards, returned 31 kickoffs for 573 yards, and scored 17 touchdowns. He set school records for receptions and receiving yards which still stand among the top ten all-time to the present day.

Professional football career

USFL

McNeil was selected by the San Antonio Gunslingers in the 1984 USFL Territorial Draft. He was later traded to the Houston Gamblers. In his two seasons with the Gamblers, he caught 91 passes for 1,518 yards, returned 69 punts for 830 yards, returned two kickoffs for 62 yards, and scored ten touchdowns. He was the USFL's leading punt returner in 1985.

NFL
McNeil was selected by the Cleveland Browns in the second round of the 1984 NFL Supplemental Draft of USFL and CFL players. He made his NFL debut in 1986 and played four seasons with the Browns, then played his fifth and final season with the Houston Oilers.  In 1987 he made the pro bowl as a kick returner, returning 34 punts for 387 yards and a career best 11.4 yards per return average.

In his five NFL seasons, McNeil caught 29 passes for 380 yards, returned 191 punts for 1,717 yards, returned 91 kickoffs for 1,852 yards, and scored four touchdowns.

In 1986, McNeil was the only player in the NFL and the first since 1978 to return both a punt and a kickoff for a touchdown in the same season.

References

External links
Entry at pro-football-reference.com
Baylor football records
Stats

1962 births
Living people
American football wide receivers
American football return specialists
Baylor Bears football players
Cleveland Browns players
American Conference Pro Bowl players
Houston Oilers players
Houston Gamblers players